Terence David John Boyle (born 29 October 1958) is a Welsh former professional footballer. During his career, he made over 500 appearances in the Football League and made two appearances for the Wales national team in 1981. A centre-half, he was highly regarded by supporters for his strong tackling and uncompromising style.

He is the current manager of the Wales national semi-professional football team and also works as a youth coach at Aldershot Town.

Early life
Born in Ammanford, Boyle attended Llanelli Boys' Grammar School and played for the school rugby team as a centre. He also represented Carmarthen in javelin.

Club career
A former captain for Wales at schoolboy level, Boyle began his career at Tottenham Hotspur, signing apprenticeship forms in April 1975 before turning professional soon after in September 1975, making his way through the youth system. Unable to oust established players such as Mike England and Keith Osgood from the side, he did not make a first team appearance at White Hart Lane and moved to Crystal Palace. He spent four years with Palace, including a loan spell at Wimbledon before joining Bristol City in 1981 in exchange for Kevin Mabbutt.

He went on to play for Newport County, being named in the 1986 Third Division PFA Team of the Year, before joining Cardiff City in August 1986 for a tribunal set fee of £22,500. The transfer proved controversial with Newport as they had expected a significantly larger fee for Boyle, who was the club captain at the time of the move. He made over 168 appearances for the Bluebirds, including helping them win promotion to Division Three in the 1987–88 season and playing in the 1988 Welsh Cup final as Cardiff defeated Wrexham 2–0. In 1989, his former Crystal Palace teammate Ian Evans brought him to Swansea City where he had recently been appointed manager. He played 47 times in the 1989–90 season before moving on to Merthyr Tydfil in the Conference League. He later moved into the Welsh Premier League with Barry Town.

He ended his playing career with player-manager roles at Ebbw Vale, Inter Cardiff and Cinderford Town.

International career

Boyle made his debut for Wales on 24 February 1981, scoring during a 3–1 victory over Republic of Ireland at Tolka Park. He made one more appearance for Wales, three months later in May 1981, when he came on as a substitute in place of Joey Jones during a 2–0 victory over Scotland.

International goals
Wales score listed first, score column indicates score after each goal.

Coaching career
In August 1994, Boyle was appointed player-manager of Welsh Premier League club Barry Town but left the role in November of the same year.

Boyle currently works for the Football Association of Wales Trust, Pro Licence holder since 2007 and is manager of the Wales national semi-professional football team. He also previously worked as assistant manager to Tomi Morgan at Porthmadog. In June 2011, he was appointed manager of Neath following the departure of Andy Dyer, but was sacked less than six months later in November 2011, along with his assistant Peter Nicholas, following a poor run of results.

In 2012, he was appointed senior professional development coach at Aldershot Town.

Honours
Cardiff City
 Welsh Cup winner: 1988

References

1958 births
Living people
English Football League players
Association football defenders
Tottenham Hotspur F.C. players
Cardiff City F.C. players
Crystal Palace F.C. players
Bristol City F.C. players
Newport County A.F.C. players
Swansea City A.F.C. players
Welsh footballers
Wales international footballers
Welsh football managers
Wimbledon F.C. players
Barry Town United F.C. players
Merthyr Town F.C. players
Cardiff Metropolitan University F.C. players
Carmarthen Town A.F.C. players
Bangor City F.C. players
People from Ammanford
Sportspeople from Carmarthenshire
Cymru Premier managers
Cymru Premier players
Wales under-21 international footballers
People educated at Llanelli Boys' Grammar School
Aldershot Town F.C. non-playing staff
Barry Town United F.C. managers
Ebbw Vale F.C. managers
Ebbw Vale F.C. players
Inter Cardiff F.C. managers
Inter Cardiff F.C. players
Cinderford Town A.F.C. managers
Cinderford Town A.F.C. players